Oh My G! is a 2015 Philippine drama romantic comedy television series directed by Veronica B. Velasco, starring Janella Salvador, Marlo Mortel and Manolo Pedrosa. The series premiered on ABS-CBN's PrimeTanghali noontime block and worldwide on The Filipino Channel from January 19, 2015, to July 24, 2015, replacing Give Love on Christmas and was replaced by Ningning.

The series is streaming online on YouTube.

Plot
Sophie Cepeda (Janella Salvador) is a teenager who struggles after both of her parents died. Sophie blamed God for the loss of her loved ones, until G (Leo Rialp) himself appears to Sophie in different forms to enlighten the latter on the obstacles she is facing.

Cast and characters

Main cast
Janella Salvador as Sophie Z. Cepeda
Marlo Mortel as Gabriel "Gabby" Luna
Manolo Pedrosa as Harry Evangelista

Actors who played as "G"
Leo Rialp (main)
Luke Jickain
Diego Loyzaga
Pen Medina
Junjun Quintana
Boboy Garovillo
Dante Ponce

Supporting cast
Sunshine Cruz as Maria Lucilla "Lucy" Zaldivar-Santiago
Janice de Belen as Rose "Teacher-Ninang" Luna
Kokoy de Santos as Carlos Miguel "Micoy" Arellano
Yen Santos as Anne Martina Reyes / Sister Marie Paul Cepeda
Axel Torres as Cyrus Valdez
Daisy Reyes as Dolly Mercado-Reyes
John Arcilla as Joe "Daddy-Ninong" Luna
Maris Racal as Junalyn Barel
Brigiding as Rene
Simon Ibarra as Martin Reyes
Dominic Ochoa as Santino "Santi" Santiago
Kazel Kinouchi as Maria Luisa "Miley" Z. Santiago
Patrick Sugui as Patrick Dizon
Edgar Allan Guzman as Vaughn Luna
John Steven de Guzman as JC Luna
Ganiel Krishnan as Helga Barrios
Issa Litton as Raki Evangelista
Kate Alejandrino as Roma de la Cruz
Julia Buencamino as Amelia "Aimee" Chua
Paolo Gumabao as Ferdinand "Ferdie" Javier
Lianne Valentin as Lianne 
Nonie Buencamino as Emmanuel Diaz
Aina Solano as Jessica Marasigan
Tom Doromal as Charles Castañeda

Guest cast
Eric Quizon as Paul Sanchez Cepeda
Maricar Reyes as Tessa Zaldivar-Cepeda
Zara Julianna Richards as young Sophie
Juan Miguel Tamayo as young Gabby
Erin Ocampo as Ceres Reyes
Anna Luna as Sister Marie Bernard
Wendy Valdez as fake Anne Reyes
Lollie Mara as Judge Corazon Castañeda
Bodjie Pascua as Des Reyes

Production

Scheduling
Initially part of Primetime Bida evening block, Oh My G! was originally planned to replace Bagito. However, the drama later became part of PrimeTanghali block, making it the official successor for Give Love on Christmas. The series was promoted and premiered back-to-back with FlordeLiza and Nasaan Ka Nang Kailangan Kita as part of Kapamilya's "Thank You Day" on January 19, 2015.

On July 7, 2015, teen actress Julia Buencamino, who played Aimee, died after committing suicide.

Extension
The series was supposed to end on July 17, 2015. Oh My G was really down on its last 3 weeks on June 29, 2015, but ABS-CBN extended it for one more week and ended it on July 24, 2015, it was later replaced by Ningning.

Reception

See also
List of programs broadcast by ABS-CBN
List of telenovelas of ABS-CBN

References

External links
 
 
 

ABS-CBN drama series
2015 Philippine television series debuts
2015 Philippine television series endings
Philippine romantic comedy television series
Television series about social media
Television series about teenagers
Filipino-language television shows
Television shows set in the Philippines